Zhang Youxia (born July 1950) is a Chinese general in the People's Liberation Army (PLA) and currently the first-ranked Vice Chairman of the Central Military Commission (CMC). He previously served as Head of the CMC Equipment Development Department, and its predecessor, the PLA General Armaments Department, from 2012 to 2017. He is the son of General Zhang Zongxun. He is a veteran of the 1979 Sino-Vietnamese War and one of the few serving generals in China with war experience.

Biography 
Zhang was born and raised in Beijing, but traces his ancestry to Yantou Village, Weinan, Shaanxi Province. He is the son of Zhang Zongxun, a Communist general in the Chinese Civil War, earning him princeling status. Zhang Youxia's father and Xi Jinping's father Xi Zhongxun both hail from the Weinan region of Shaanxi.  

Zhang attended Beijing Jingshan School. He joined the army in 1968 at 18 years of age. In 1976 he was serving in the 14th Group Army, stationed in Yunnan province; he was rapidly promoted. He took part in the border clashes of 1979 between China and Vietnam, and then the 1984 Battle of Laoshan.

In August 2000, he was named commander of the 13th Group Army. In December 2005, he became the vice commander of the Beijing Military Region. He was promoted to commander of the Shenyang Military Region in September 2007. He attained the rank of major general in 1997, and lieutenant general in 2007. In July 2011, he was promoted to General. Prior to the 18th Party Congress held in 2012, a wholesale re-shuffle of the PLA leadership took place. Zhang was tapped to replace Chang Wanquan as director of the PLA General Armaments Department. In November 2012, as is customary for the directors of the "four big departments" of the PLA, Zhang was named a member of the Central Military Commission.

In October 2017, Zhang was named Vice Chairman of the Central Military Commission.

Zhang is a member of the 19th Politburo of the Chinese Communist Party. He was previously a member of the 17th and 18th Central Committees of the Chinese Communist Party.

Although expected to retire under the Chinese Communist Party's informal retirement age, Zhang remained on the Politburo following the October 23 meeting and is presently a member of the 20th Politburo of the Chinese Communist Party.

References 

1950 births
Living people
People's Liberation Army generals from Beijing
Members of the 20th Politburo of the Chinese Communist Party
Members of the 19th Politburo of the Chinese Communist Party
Members of the 18th Central Committee of the Chinese Communist Party
Members of the 17th Central Committee of the Chinese Communist Party
Delegates to the 13th National People's Congress